Chintalapalle is a village in Razole Mandal, Dr. B.R. Ambedkar Konaseema district in the state of Andhra Pradesh in India.

Geography 

Demographics 
 India census, Chintalapalle had a population of 6320, out of which 3161 were male and 3159 were female. The population of children below 6 years of age was 8%. The literacy rate of the village was 81%.

References 

Villages in Razole mandal